Péter Lipcsei (born 28 March 1972 in Kazincbarcika) is a Hungarian football manager and former professional player.

International career 
He made his debut for the Hungary national team in 1991, and gained 58 caps and one goal until 2005.

Honours
Ferencváros
Nemzeti Bajnokság I: 1991–92, 1994–95, 2000–01, 2003–04
Nemzeti Bajnokság II (Eastern Group): 2008–09
Magyar Kupa: 1990–91, 1992–93, 1993–94, 1994–95, 2002–03, 2003–04
Magyar Szuperkupa: 1993, 1994, 1995, 2004

Porto
Primeira Divisão: 1995–96

Individual
UEFA Cup Winners' Cup Top Scorer: 1991–92
Hungarian Footballer of the Year: 1991, 1995

References

External links

Ferencvárosi profile 

1972 births
Living people
People from Kazincbarcika
Hungarian footballers
Association football midfielders
Hungary international footballers
Nemzeti Bajnokság I players
Primeira Liga players
Austrian Football Bundesliga players
Ferencvárosi TC footballers
FC Porto players
S.C. Espinho players
FC Red Bull Salzburg players
Hungarian expatriate footballers
Hungarian expatriate sportspeople in Portugal
Expatriate footballers in Portugal
Hungarian expatriate sportspeople in Austria
Expatriate footballers in Austria
Hungarian football managers
Soroksár SC managers
Ferencvárosi TC non-playing staff
Sportspeople from Borsod-Abaúj-Zemplén County